Illinois Public Access Opinion 16-006 is a binding opinion issued in 2016 by the Illinois Attorney General pursuant to the state's Freedom of Information Act (FOIA). Issued in the aftermath of the murder of Laquan McDonald, the opinion addressed a public records request from CNN for private emails by officers of the Chicago Police Department (CPD) related to the incident. After CPD denied CNN's request, the Attorney General's office, led by Lisa Madigan, ruled that the police officers' private emails about McDonald's murder were subject to public disclosure, even though those emails were communicated on accounts outside of the police department's email servers. The binding opinion was later upheld by the Circuit Court of Cook County, though CNN never received the records that it had requested. 

A prior appellate court decision in City of Champaign v. Madigan had established that communications about public business on personal electronic devices may be subject to disclosure. However, the scope of that decision applied only during public meetings convened by a city council or other public body, and it was unclear how it would apply to employees. 

In Public Access Opinion 16-006, the Attorney General found that the police officers were acting on behalf of the police department, turning their messages into public records of the police department. This more recent development was hailed by public access advocates as an important step towards transparency, specifically regarding the openness of public business transacted on personal electronic devices.

Background 

On October 20, 2014, Laquan McDonald was fatally shot in Chicago by police officer Jason Van Dyke. Preliminary reports by the Chicago Police Department (CPD) suggested that McDonald was behaving erratically, and that the shooting was justifiable, leading to Van Dyke not being charged at the time. The shooting was recorded by a CPD dashboard camera. However, the video was not initially released to the public, and a lawsuit was filed in Circuit Court of Cook County related to the release of the video. The court issued its order on November 19, 2015, requiring CPD to release the video. CPD complied on November 24, 2015, thirteen months after the shooting. The video revealed that McDonald had been walking away from police when he was shot.

Off-duty police officers reportedly discussed the incident on personal devices and accounts. On January 28, 2016, Courtney Yager, a producer for CNN, submitted a Freedom of Information Act (FOIA) request to CPD for "all emails related to Laquan McDonald from Police Department email accounts and personal email accounts where business was discussed" for twelve CPD officers, including Van Dyke and others involved in the case. The request covered emails from October 19 through October 24, 2014 (around the date of the shooting), and November 19 through November 29, 2015 (around the date of the circuit court's order, and the subsequent release of the video). CPD provided a large number of emails from the police officers' CPD-issued email accounts. However, CPD failed to search for the officers' private emails, despite CNN's request.

On April 28, 2016, CNN attorney Drew Shenkman appealed CPD's omission to the Public Access Counselor, an attorney in the office of the Illinois Attorney General who is responsible for enforcing FOIA. CNN's situation was not unique. By 2018, journalists and citizen activists filed at least 10 appeals to the Public Access Counselor after Chicago officials blocked requests for records related to the murder of McDonald.

Case law 
Public bodies in Illinois, including CPD, are required under FOIA to make all public records open to disclosure. Public records include all emails "pertaining to the transaction of public business, regardless of physical form or characteristics, having been prepared by or for, or having been or being used by, received by, in the possession of, or under the control of any public body".

The Illinois Appellate Court previously issued a ruling in 2013 concerning public access to records stored on private electronic devices. In City of Champaign v. Madigan, the court considered a FOIA dispute regarding elected officials who were observed using their cell phones during a city council meeting to communicate with each other. The court found that the communications on the cell phones in question must be disclosed to the public, as long as they pertained to public business. Because the city council had convened a public meeting, the elected officials were acting collectively as a public body. Therefore, the court ruled that the communications, though stored on personal devices, were subject to disclosure. 

However, the court's decision left room for interpretation in other contexts. A city council technically is not acting as a public body until it has convened a meeting to conduct its business. Council members are not considered a "public body" when acting individually, therefore their private communications would not constitute "use", "preparation", or "possession" by a public body. For example, a council member would not necessarily have to disclose messages received from constituents on their private electronic devices while at home. Similar reasoning could be applied to employees (rather than elected members) of the public body. Still, the applicability of City of Champaign was unclear, as a legal expert noted that "executive branch employees" act on the public body's behalf. In May 2016, the Circuit Court of Cook County clarified the matter when it ruled that personal emails of Chicago Mayor Rahm Emanuel may be subject to disclosure, even when stored on private devices.

Opinion 

Relying on the appellate court's ruling in City of Champaign, CPD argued that the emails were sent by individual officers, and could not be considered public records because they were not prepared by or for CPD. Further, CPD argued that the emails were not stored on CPD's servers, and therefore were not under the police department's control.

The Attorney General's office issued its ruling on August 9, 2016. It rejected CPD's arguments, ruling that officers' emails about public business are subject to disclosure, even when sent on private devices. To determine whether an email pertains to public business, one must focus on the content of the email, not the method by which it is transmitted. The opinion cited a federal appellate court decision, Competitive Enterprise Institute v. Office of Science and Technology Policy, noting that "an agency always acts through its employees and officials. If one of them possesses what would otherwise be agency records, the records do not lose their agency character just because the official who possesses them takes them out the door." Otherwise, public employees could evade public scrutiny by storing their records on private accounts, contrary to the intent of the Illinois General Assembly to ensure "public access to full and complete information regarding the affairs of government". However, while the ruling applies to government employees, it does not apply to elected officials.

Additionally, CPD suggested that searching the private email accounts would violate the officers' personal privacy. However, the Attorney General rejected this argument as well, because FOIA explicitly states that "the disclosure of information that bears on the public duties of public employees and officials shall not be considered an invasion of personal privacy".

CPD also countered that it could not compel employees to grant CPD access to private email accounts. However, the opinion noted that CPD did not necessarily have to obtain access to the officers' private emails to perform an automated search. Instead, CPD could meet its obligations by ordering the officers to search their own private accounts themselves, and to turn over relevant emails to CPD. The opinion also noted that its scope was limited only to emails pertaining to "public business". Emails regarding personal matters are not subject to public disclosure.

The ruling was a binding opinion, a rare power that is exercised by the Attorney General in only less than half of one percent of complaints submitted to the Public Access Counselor. CPD was required to comply with the decision by searching the officers' email accounts, or file for administrative review in the Circuit Court of Cook or Sangamon County within 35 days.

Appeal 
CPD appealed the ruling in the Circuit Court of Cook County, maintaining that the officers' private emails are not subject to public disclosure. CPD contended that the Attorney General incorrectly equated individual police officers with the police department, and that it incorrectly concluded that individual officers are transacting public business as a public body when communicating privately. Furthermore, CPD argued that the ruling was too broad because it obligated CPD to search the personal emails and personal devices of all employees. In CPD's view, FOIA does not impose such a requirement, as the law does not provide a way for a public body to force its employees to grant access to private email accounts.

CPD lost the appeal on September 20, 2017, with Judge Pamela McLean Meyerson writing, "Government operations in a free society must not be shrouded in secrecy." Meyerson also found the FOIA request to be reasonable and limited in time and scope. Nonetheless, CNN never received the emails that it had requested. Each of the officers, individually or through their attorneys, either refused to provide emails, ignored the request, or denied having any relevant emails.

Reactions 
The ruling was hailed by public access advocates as an important step towards transparency in a national debate concerning access to discussions of public business on privately held electronic devices. Charles N. Davis, Dean of the Henry W. Grady College of Journalism and Mass Communication at the University of Georgia, commented that the opinion "correctly focuses on the question whether the communication is intended to memorialize public business... If the opinion had come down the other way, it would send a clear signal to every public official on how to avoid public records laws. All they would have to do is get a Hotmail account and start discussing public business." In additional to the previous court order regarding Emanuel's emails, journalists pointed towards similar public access issues during the administration of Illinois Governor Bruce Rauner and the Hillary Clinton email controversy.

Benjamin Schuster, a Chicago-based attorney, criticized the Attorney General for not distinguishing between the dispute in City of Champaign v. Madigan and the CPD's records at issue in this case. He also criticized the opinion for not clearly defining when a document is a "public record", and for not specifying how much authority a public body has to compel employees to release private messages. In 2017, the General Assembly considered a bill that would have made it more difficult to obtain records not already in the control of a public body, an apparent response to City of Champaign and this opinion. The bill expired in January 2019.

The opinion has led to concerns about potential impacts to the boundaries of privacy at the workplace, especially with the intermingling of work on personal devices and evolving attitudes towards personal privacy. Legal experts noted that public bodies should not allow officials and employees to conduct public business on private accounts and devices. If public bodies receive a FOIA request for such communications, they may have to conduct a potentially cumbersome and time-consuming search. A court may also order the device or account to be searched by a third party, should a lawsuit arise over whether any records were withheld. If officials and employees continued to conduct public business on personal devices, a good practice would be to forward such communications to government accounts, to help facilitate responses to future FOIA requests. If a communication involves both public business and private matters, the private portions may still be redacted. 

Davis suggested that the state legislature could address this issue by mandating that all public business be conducted on governmental email accounts. Another bill was introduced in the General Assembly in 2017, proposing an amendment to the Local Records Act to explicitly state that all emails of government officials and employees are public records "regardless of whether the email is sent or received on a personal or agency-provided email address". The bill also would have required public officials and employees to use government-issued email addresses, and forward any emails related to public business on personal accounts to their governmental accounts. This bill likewise expired in January 2019.

Notes

References

External links 

 Full text of Illinois Public Access Opinion 16-006

Legal history of Illinois
Freedom of information in the United States